Pokrovka is a village in Mykolaiv Raion (district) in Mykolaiv Oblast of southern Ukraine, at about  southwest by south from the centre of Mykolaiv city. It belongs to Ochakiv urban hromada, one of the hromadas of Ukraine.

History

Until 18 July 2020, Pokrovka was the administrative center of Ochakiv Raion. In July 2020, as part of the administrative reform of Ukraine, which reduced the number of raions of Mykolaiv Oblast to four, Ochakiv Raion was merged into Mykolaiv Raion.

The village came under attack and was occupied by Russian forces during the Russian invasion of Ukraine in 2022. The village, as well as all other occupied territory in the Mykolaiv Oblast, was illegally annexed by Russia as part of their Kherson Oblast.

Following a Russian withdrawal and a counter offensive by Ukrainian forces between November 9th and 11th, almost all settlements in the Mykolaiv Oblast where liberated from Russian control. The exceptions being Pokrovka as well the other settlements on the Kiburn Peninsula, Pokrovske and Vasylivka.

Nature
The village is located within the Biloberezhia Sviatoslav National Park, in the Dnieper estuary.

References

External links

Villages in Mykolaiv Raion, Mykolaiv Oblast